The 1996 AFL season was the 100th season of the Australian Football League (AFL), the highest level senior Australian rules football competition in Australia, which was known as the Victorian Football League until 1989. The season featured sixteen clubs and ran from 29 March until 28 September. It comprised a 22-game home-and-away season followed by a finals series featuring the top eight clubs, as well as several celebrations of the league's centenary.

The premiership was won by the North Melbourne Football Club for the third time, after it defeated  by 43 points in the 1996 AFL Grand Final.

AFL Draft
See 1996 AFL Draft.

Lightning Premiership

In the 1996 AFL Lightning Premiership final,  defeated the  6.2 (38) to 2.9 (21) at Waverley Park.

Ansett Australia Cup

In the 1996 Ansett Australia Cup final,  defeated  20.10 (130) to 10.12 (72) at Waverley Park.

Premiership season

Round 1

|- bgcolor="#CCCCFF"
| Home team
| Score
| Away team
| Score
| Venue
| Attendance
| Date
|- bgcolor="#FFFFFF"
| 
| 8.8 (56)
| 
| 27.21 (183)
| MCG
| 46,832
| Friday, 29 March
|- bgcolor="#FFFFFF"
| 
| 15.14 (104)
| 
| 19.8 (122)
| MCG
| 52,271
| Saturday, 30 March
|- bgcolor="#FFFFFF"
| 
| 12.13 (85)
| 
| 15.19 (109)
| Waverley Park
| 23,434
| Saturday, 30 March
|- bgcolor="#FFFFFF"
| 
| 11.5 (71)
| 
| 13.14 (92)
| Whitten Oval
| 10,239
| Saturday, 30 March
|- bgcolor="#FFFFFF"
| 
| 21.15 (141)
| 
| 7.12 (54)
| Gabba
| 14,222
| Saturday, 30 March
|- bgcolor="#FFFFFF"
| 
| 16.13 (109)
| 
| 12.15 (87)
| MCG
| 70,152
| Sunday, 31 March
|- bgcolor="#FFFFFF"
| 
| 6.9 (45)
| 
| 9.13 (67)
| Subiaco Oval
| 33,041
| Sunday, 31 March
|- bgcolor="#FFFFFF"
| 
| 20.10 (130)
| 
| 6.4 (40)
| Football Park
| 40,665
| Sunday, 31 March

Round 2

|- bgcolor="#CCCCFF"
| Home team
| Score
| Away team
| Score
| Venue
| Attendance
| Date
|- bgcolor="#FFFFFF"
| 
| 26.12 (168)
| 
| 5.7 (37)
| MCG
| 30,873
| Saturday, 6 April
|- bgcolor="#FFFFFF"
| 
| 26.8 (164)
| 
| 20.14 (134)
| Kardinia Park
| 25,950
| Saturday, 6 April
|- bgcolor="#FFFFFF"
| 
| 6.15 (51)
| 
| 14.14 (98)
| Waverley Park
| 38,263
| Saturday, 6 April
|- bgcolor="#FFFFFF"
| 
| 15.11 (101)
| 
| 21.7 (133)
| Whitten Oval
| 8,685
| Saturday, 6 April
|- bgcolor="#FFFFFF"
| 
| 11.11 (77)
| 
| 16.7 (103)
| WACA
| 29,213
| Saturday, 6 April
|- bgcolor="#FFFFFF"
| 
| 10.12 (72)
| 
| 15.11 (101)
| MCG
| 62,207
| Sunday, 7 April
|- bgcolor="#FFFFFF"
| 
| 9.17 (71)
| 
| 13.22 (100)
| SCG
| 10,965
| Sunday, 7 April
|- bgcolor="#FFFFFF"
| 
| 27.11 (173)
| 
| 11.13 (79)
| MCG
| 53,268
| Monday, 8 April

Round 3

|- bgcolor="#CCCCFF"
| Home team
| Score
| Away team
| Score
| Venue
| Attendance
| Date
|- bgcolor="#FFFFFF"
| 
| 21.16 (142)
| 
| 12.6 (78)
| Football Park
| 43,766
| Friday, 12 April
|- bgcolor="#FFFFFF"
| 
| 17.19 (121)
| 
| 10.10 (70)
| Whitten Oval
| 14,345
| Saturday, 13 April
|- bgcolor="#FFFFFF"
| 
| 12.8 (80)
| 
| 22.21 (153)
| Waverley Park
| 20,331
| Saturday, 13 April
|- bgcolor="#FFFFFF"
| 
| 13.12 (90)
| 
| 15.18 (108)
| Gabba
| 20,635
| Saturday, 13 April
|- bgcolor="#FFFFFF"
| 
| 15.17 (107)
| 
| 10.13 (73)
| SCG
| 17,674
| Sunday, 14 April
|- bgcolor="#FFFFFF"
| 
| 15.12 (102)
| 
| 6.13 (49)
| Subiaco Oval
| 22,652
| Sunday, 14 April
|- bgcolor="#FFFFFF"
| 
| 16.13 (109)
| 
| 6.14 (50)
| Waverley Park
| 20,852
| Sunday, 14 April
|- bgcolor="#FFFFFF"
| 
| 14.14 (98)
| 
| 13.10 (88)
| Optus Oval
| 11,881
| Sunday, 14 April

Round 4

|- bgcolor="#CCCCFF"
| Home team
| Score
| Away team
| Score
| Venue
| Attendance
| Date
|- bgcolor="#FFFFFF"
| 
| 18.17 (125)
| 
| 14.11 (95)
| Gabba
| 17,469
| Friday, 19 April
|- bgcolor="#FFFFFF"
| 
| 21.7 (133)
| 
| 12.14 (86)
| Optus Oval
| 19,051
| Saturday, 20 April
|- bgcolor="#FFFFFF"
| 
| 14.14 (98)
| 
| 8.13 (61)
| Victoria Park
| 23,170
| Saturday, 20 April
|- bgcolor="#FFFFFF"
| 
| 24.16 (160)
| 
| 11.9 (75)
| Waverley Park
| 17,625
| Saturday, 20 April
|- bgcolor="#FFFFFF"
| 
| 8.9 (57)
| 
| 8.9 (57)
| Whitten Oval
| 16,804
| Saturday, 20 April
|- bgcolor="#FFFFFF"
| 
| 23.23 (161)
| 
| 9.11 (65)
| Football Park
| 45,266
| Saturday, 20 April
|- bgcolor="#FFFFFF"
| 
| 9.16 (70)
| 
| 10.11 (71)
| Waverley Park
| 33,847
| Sunday, 21 April
|- bgcolor="#FFFFFF"
| 
| 12.16 (88)
| 
| 16.10 (106)
| Subiaco Oval
| 30,837
| Sunday, 21 April

Round 5

|- bgcolor="#CCCCFF"
| Home team
| Score
| Away team
| Score
| Venue
| Attendance
| Date
|- bgcolor="#FFFFFF"
| 
| 16.9 (105)
| 
| 17.15 (117)
| MCG
| 87,549
| Thursday, 25 April
|- bgcolor="#FFFFFF"
| 
| 13.18 (96)
| 
| 8.11 (59)
| WACA
| 26,618
| Friday, 26 April
|- bgcolor="#FFFFFF"
| 
| 12.14 (86)
| 
| 12.13 (85)
| Optus Oval
| 19,927
| Saturday, 27 April
|- bgcolor="#FFFFFF"
| 
| 13.13 (91)
| 
| 12.16 (88)
| Kardinia Park
| 26,016
| Saturday, 27 April
|- bgcolor="#FFFFFF"
| 
| 23.14 (152)
| 
| 17.11 (113)
| MCG
| 32,215
| Saturday, 27 April
|- bgcolor="#FFFFFF"
| 
| 13.10 (88)
| 
| 11.10 (76)
| SCG
| 20,227
| Saturday, 27 April
|- bgcolor="#FFFFFF"
| 
| 24.14 (158)
| 
| 6.13 (49)
| Gabba
| 14,495
| Sunday, 28 April
|- bgcolor="#FFFFFF"
| 
| 16.20 (116)
| 
| 13.12 (90)
| Waverley Park
| 27,094
| Sunday, 28 April

Round 6

|- bgcolor="#CCCCFF"
| Home team
| Score
| Away team
| Score
| Venue
| Attendance
| Date
|- bgcolor="#FFFFFF"
| 
| 14.6 (90)
| 
| 12.18 (90)
| SCG
| 22,088
| Friday, 3 May
|- bgcolor="#FFFFFF"
| 
| 13.15 (93)
| 
| 15.14 (104)
| MCG
| 50,074
| Friday, 3 May
|- bgcolor="#FFFFFF"
| 
| 23.14 (152)
| 
| 12.8 (80)
| Victoria Park
| 26,459
| Saturday, 4 May
|- bgcolor="#FFFFFF"
| 
| 7.8 (50)
| 
| 24.12 (156)
| Optus Oval
| 8,747
| Saturday, 4 May
|- bgcolor="#FFFFFF"
| 
| 9.8 (62)
| 
| 23.16 (154)
| Whitten Oval
| 13,497
| Saturday, 4 May
|- bgcolor="#FFFFFF"
| 
| 9.11 (65)
| 
| 13.8 (86)
| Waverley Park
| 30,225
| Saturday, 4 May
|- bgcolor="#FFFFFF"
| 
| 9.10 (64)
| 
| 12.8 (80)
| MCG
| 31,024
| Sunday, 5 May
|- bgcolor="#FFFFFF"
| 
| 12.13 (85)
| 
| 17.8 (110)
| Subiaco Oval
| 24,591
| Sunday, 5 May

Round 7

|- bgcolor="#CCCCFF"
| Home team
| Score
| Away team
| Score
| Venue
| Attendance
| Date
|- bgcolor="#FFFFFF"
| 
| 22.11 (143)
| 
| 17.12 (114)
| MCG
| 75,632
| Wednesday, 8 May
|- bgcolor="#FFFFFF"
| 
| 14.11 (95)
| 
| 18.10 (118)
| MCG
| 71,663
| Friday, 10 May
|- bgcolor="#FFFFFF"
| 
| 18.17 (125)
| 
| 8.14 (62)
| Optus Oval
| 16,176
| Saturday, 11 May
|- bgcolor="#FFFFFF"
| 
| 5.8 (38)
| 
| 12.10 (82)
| MCG
| 23,660
| Saturday, 11 May
|- bgcolor="#FFFFFF"
| 
| 15.14 (104)
| 
| 5.11 (41)
| Gabba
| 20,053
| Saturday, 11 May
|- bgcolor="#FFFFFF"
| 
| 17.11 (113)
| 
| 9.8 (62)
| MCG
| 25,691
| Sunday, 12 May
|- bgcolor="#FFFFFF"
| 
| 19.11 (125)
| 
| 7.16 (58)
| Subiaco Oval
| 32,312
| Sunday, 12 May
|- bgcolor="#FFFFFF"
| 
| 20.12 (132)
| 
| 5.6 (36)
| Football Park
| 40,386
| Sunday, 12 May

Note: The opening four matches of this round replicated the opening round of the inaugural 1897 VFL season, with Essendon and Geelong playing each other on the day of the 99th anniversary.

Round 8

|- bgcolor="#CCCCFF"
| Home team
| Score
| Away team
| Score
| Venue
| Attendance
| Date
|- bgcolor="#FFFFFF"
| 
| 15.18 (108)
| 
| 14.14 (98)
| Gabba
| 21,644
| Friday, 17 May
|- bgcolor="#FFFFFF"
| 
| 12.14 (86)
| 
| 15.8 (98)
| MCG
| 67,931
| Friday, 17 May
|- bgcolor="#FFFFFF"
| 
| 19.8 (122)
| 
| 10.11 (71)
| Waverley Park
| 20,527
| Saturday, 18 May
|- bgcolor="#FFFFFF"
| 
| 16.11 (107)
| 
| 10.16 (76)
| Whitten Oval
| 5,083
| Saturday, 18 May
|- bgcolor="#FFFFFF"
| 
| 20.24 (144)
| 
| 14.5 (89)
| MCG
| 49,939
| Saturday, 18 May
|- bgcolor="#FFFFFF"
| 
| 14.16 (100)
| 
| 9.10 (64)
| WACA
| 31,411
| Saturday, 18 May
|- bgcolor="#FFFFFF"
| 
| 13.19 (97)
| 
| 11.7 (73)
| Football Park
| 43,370
| Sunday, 19 May
|- bgcolor="#FFFFFF"
| 
| 13.6 (84)
| 
| 23.13 (151)
| MCG
| 36,766
| Sunday, 19 May

Note: Ben Hart took the mark of the year in Adelaide's win over St Kilda.
Note: Fitzroy's victory was the last win they had in the AFL before departing.

Round 9

|- bgcolor="#CCCCFF"
| Home team
| Score
| Away team
| Score
| Venue
| Attendance
| Date
|- bgcolor="#FFFFFF"
| 
| 25.20 (170)
| 
| 9.11 (65)
| MCG
| 19,964
| Friday, 24 May
|- bgcolor="#FFFFFF"
| 
| 11.23 (89)
| 
| 12.5 (77)
| MCG
| 37,288
| Saturday, 25 May
|- bgcolor="#FFFFFF"
| 
| 18.11 (119)
| 
| 11.13 (79)
| Whitten Oval
| 11,140
| Saturday, 25 May
|- bgcolor="#FFFFFF"
| 
| 8.8 (56)
| 
| 14.6 (90)
| Waverley Park
| 14,286
| Saturday, 25 May
|- bgcolor="#FFFFFF"
| 
| 21.6 (132)
| 
| 10.14 (74)
| SCG
| 26,537
| Sunday, 26 May
|- bgcolor="#FFFFFF"
| 
| 17.18 (120)
| 
| 10.6 (66)
| Subiaco Oval
| 20,934
| Sunday, 26 May
|- bgcolor="#FFFFFF"
| 
| 9.15 (69)
| 
| 13.13 (91)
| Waverley Park
| 41,023
| Sunday, 26 May
|- bgcolor="#FFFFFF"
| 
| 11.10 (76)
| 
| 21.13 (139)
| MCG
| 56,609
| Monday, 27 May

Round 10

|- bgcolor="#CCCCFF"
| Home team
| Score
| Away team
| Score
| Venue
| Attendance
| Date
|- bgcolor="#FFFFFF"
| 
| 10.9 (69)
| 
| 12.17 (89)
| MCG
| 22,416
| Friday, 7 June
|- bgcolor="#FFFFFF"
| 
| 15.11 (101)
| 
| 13.12 (90)
| MCG
| 59,062
| Saturday, 8 June
|- bgcolor="#FFFFFF"
| 
| 14.14 (98)
| 
| 15.8 (98)
| Kardinia Park
| 24,800
| Saturday, 8 June
|- bgcolor="#FFFFFF"
| 
| 10.7 (67)
| 
| 21.11 (137)
| Whitten Oval
| 9,701
| Saturday, 8 June
|- bgcolor="#FFFFFF"
| 
| 9.13 (67)
| 
| 13.11 (89)
| Waverley Park
| 43,925
| Saturday, 8 June
|- bgcolor="#FFFFFF"
| 
| 7.11 (53)
| 
| 17.8 (110)
| Subiaco Oval
| 19,350
| Sunday, 9 June
|- bgcolor="#FFFFFF"
| 
| 11.10 (76)
| 
| 19.16 (130)
| Football Park
| 43,398
| Sunday, 9 June
|- bgcolor="#FFFFFF"
| 
| 17.12 (114)
| 
| 10.16 (76)
| MCG
| 48,302
| Monday, 10 June

Round 11

|- bgcolor="#CCCCFF"
| Home team
| Score
| Away team
| Score
| Venue
| Attendance
| Date
|- bgcolor="#FFFFFF"
| 
| 20.9 (129)
| 
| 12.13 (85)
| Kardinia Park
| 21,516
| Saturday, 15 June
|- bgcolor="#FFFFFF"
| 
| 16.12 (108)
| 
| 14.15 (99)
| Waverley Park
| 16,652
| Saturday, 15 June
|- bgcolor="#FFFFFF"
| 
| 10.13 (73)
| 
| 24.8 (152)
| Optus Oval
| 18,644
| Saturday, 15 June
|- bgcolor="#FFFFFF"
| 
| 21.13 (139)
| 
| 15.15 (105)
| MCG
| 39,029
| Saturday, 15 June
|- bgcolor="#FFFFFF"
| 
| 5.8 (38)
| 
| 9.8 (62)
| Gabba
| 20,225
| Saturday, 15 June
|- bgcolor="#FFFFFF"
| 
| 16.19 (115)
| 
| 9.8 (62)
| Subiaco Oval
| 34,832
| Sunday, 16 June
|- bgcolor="#FFFFFF"
| 
| 13.12 (90)
| 
| 12.17 (89)
| MCG
| 31,383
| Sunday, 16 June
|- bgcolor="#FFFFFF"
| 
| 8.8 (56)
| 
| 18.11 (119)
| Whitten Oval
| 10,836
| Sunday, 16 June

Round 12

|- bgcolor="#CCCCFF"
| Home team
| Score
| Away team
| Score
| Venue
| Attendance
| Date
|- bgcolor="#FFFFFF"
| 
| 19.14 (128)
| 
| 13.4 (82)
| MCG
| 39,044
| Friday, 21 June
|- bgcolor="#FFFFFF"
| 
| 14.11 (95)
| 
| 17.14 (116)
| MCG
| 61,448
| Saturday, 22 June
|- bgcolor="#FFFFFF"
| 
| 17.10 (112)
| 
| 13.15 (93)
| Kardinia Park
| 22,116
| Saturday, 22 June
|- bgcolor="#FFFFFF"
| 
| 17.12 (114)
| 
| 12.11 (83)
| Waverley Park
| 16,217
| Saturday, 22 June
|- bgcolor="#FFFFFF"
| 
| 18.15 (123)
| 
| 6.10 (46)
| Gabba
| 14,871
| Saturday, 22 June
|- bgcolor="#FFFFFF"
| 
| 18.15 (123)
| 
| 11.11 (77)
| SCG
| 22,689
| Sunday, 23 June
|- bgcolor="#FFFFFF"
| 
| 16.11 (107)
| 
| 14.11 (95)
| MCG
| 39,515
| Sunday, 23 June
|- bgcolor="#FFFFFF"
| 
| 22.9 (141)
| 
| 17.6 (108)
| Subiaco Oval
| 29,434
| Sunday, 23 June

Round 13

|- bgcolor="#CCCCFF"
| Home team
| Score
| Away team
| Score
| Venue
| Attendance
| Date
|- bgcolor="#FFFFFF"
| 
| 10.9 (69)
| 
| 14.8 (92)
| MCG
| 69,072
| Friday, 28 June
|- bgcolor="#FFFFFF"
| 
| 13.13 (91)
| 
| 15.12 (102)
| Optus Oval
| 20,030
| Saturday, 29 June
|- bgcolor="#FFFFFF"
| 
| 6.3 (39)
| 
| 25.16 (166)
| Whitten Oval
| 10,504
| Saturday, 29 June
|- bgcolor="#FFFFFF"
| 
| 14.12 (96)
| 
| 7.8 (50)
| Waverley Park
| 13,824
| Saturday, 29 June
|- bgcolor="#FFFFFF"
| 
| 18.13 (121)
| 
| 15.10 (100)
| MCG
| 43,481
| Saturday, 29 June
|- bgcolor="#FFFFFF"
| 
| 8.10 (58)
| 
| 9.20 (74)
| WACA
| 19,360
| Saturday, 29 June
|- bgcolor="#FFFFFF"
| 
| 10.12 (72)
| 
| 19.9 (123)
| Football Park
| 37,557
| Sunday, 30 June
|- bgcolor="#FFFFFF"
| 
| 9.5 (59)
| 
| 11.5 (71)
| Whitten Oval
| 11,184
| Sunday, 30 June

Round 14

|- bgcolor="#CCCCFF"
| Home team
| Score
| Away team
| Score
| Venue
| Attendance
| Date
|- bgcolor="#FFFFFF"
| 
| 21.18 (144)
| 
| 13.11 (89)
| MCG
| 68,537
| Friday, 5 July
|- bgcolor="#FFFFFF"
| 
| 17.12 (114)
| 
| 11.15 (81)
| Waverley Park
| 30,886
| Saturday, 6 July
|- bgcolor="#FFFFFF"
| 
| 7.10 (52)
| 
| 17.16 (118)
| Optus Oval
| 12,748
| Saturday, 6 July
|- bgcolor="#FFFFFF"
| 
| 7.9 (51)
| 
| 10.8 (68)
| MCG
| 37,482
| Saturday, 6 July
|- bgcolor="#FFFFFF"
| 
| 15.12 (102)
| 
| 14.10 (94)
| Football Park
| 34,183
| Saturday, 6 July
|- bgcolor="#FFFFFF"
| 
| 18.17 (125)
| 
| 11.8 (74)
| SCG
| 44,047
| Sunday, 7 July
|- bgcolor="#FFFFFF"
| 
| 14.10 (94)
| 
| 10.7 (67)
| MCG
| 22,852
| Sunday, 7 July
|- bgcolor="#FFFFFF"
| 
| 11.11 (77)
| 
| 15.10 (100)
| Subiaco Oval
| 17,697
| Sunday, 7 July

Round 15

|- bgcolor="#CCCCFF"
| Home team
| Score
| Away team
| Score
| Venue
| Attendance
| Date
|- bgcolor="#FFFFFF"
| 
| 20.11 (131)
| 
| 9.9 (63)
| WACA
| 22,044
| Friday, 12 July
|- bgcolor="#FFFFFF"
| 
| 19.17 (131)
| 
| 9.10 (64)
| Optus Oval
| 20,102
| Saturday, 13 July
|- bgcolor="#FFFFFF"
| 
| 22.12 (144)
| 
| 12.11 (83)
| MCG
| 34,514
| Saturday, 13 July
|- bgcolor="#FFFFFF"
| 
| 10.12 (72)
| 
| 11.8 (74)
| Kardinia Park
| 22,207
| Saturday, 13 July
|- bgcolor="#FFFFFF"
| 
| 11.13 (79)
| 
| 14.12 (96)
| Waverley Park
| 34,337
| Saturday, 13 July
|- bgcolor="#FFFFFF"
| 
| 15.13 (103)
| 
| 10.8 (68)
| Gabba
| 20,378
| Sunday, 14 July
|- bgcolor="#FFFFFF"
| 
| 12.9 (81)
| 
| 18.19 (127)
| MCG
| 41,380
| Sunday, 14 July
|- bgcolor="#FFFFFF"
| 
| 18.9 (117)
| 
| 15.9 (99)
| Whitten Oval
| 8,674
| Sunday, 14 July

Round 16

|- bgcolor="#CCCCFF"
| Home team
| Score
| Away team
| Score
| Venue
| Attendance
| Date
|- bgcolor="#FFFFFF"
| 
| 17.16 (118)
| 
| 4.5 (29)
| MCG
| 24,778
| Friday, 19 July
|- bgcolor="#FFFFFF"
| 
| 15.18 (108)
| 
| 13.10 (88)
| MCG
| 58,768
| Saturday, 20 July
|- bgcolor="#FFFFFF"
| 
| 3.4 (22)
| 
| 4.12 (36)
| Whitten Oval
| 9,994
| Saturday, 20 July
|- bgcolor="#FFFFFF"
| 
| 13.10 (88)
| 
| 4.6 (30)
| Kardinia Park
| 17,538
| Saturday, 20 July
|- bgcolor="#FFFFFF"
| 
| 15.8 (98)
| 
| 7.7 (49)
| Waverley Park
| 28,670
| Saturday, 20 July
|- bgcolor="#FFFFFF"
| 
| 16.14 (110)
| 
| 12.16 (88)
| SCG
| 29,174
| Sunday, 21 July
|- bgcolor="#FFFFFF"
| 
| 12.10 (82)
| 
| 7.6 (48)
| Subiaco Oval
| 35,406
| Sunday, 21 July
|- bgcolor="#FFFFFF"
| 
| 17.14 (116)
| 
| 10.16 (76)
| Victoria Park
| 23,567
| Sunday, 21 July

Round 17

|- bgcolor="#CCCCFF"
| Home team
| Score
| Away team
| Score
| Venue
| Attendance
| Date
|- bgcolor="#FFFFFF"
| 
| 11.4 (70)
| 
| 28.15 (183)
| MCG
| 20,955
| Friday, 26 July
|- bgcolor="#FFFFFF"
| 
| 13.13 (91)
| 
| 11.16 (82)
| MCG
| 65,420
| Saturday, 27 July
|- bgcolor="#FFFFFF"
| 
| 14.16 (100)
| 
| 11.10 (76)
| Waverley Park
| 24,289
| Saturday, 27 July
|- bgcolor="#FFFFFF"
| 
| 17.12 (114)
| 
| 11.7 (73)
| Optus Oval
| 19,081
| Saturday, 27 July
|- bgcolor="#FFFFFF"
| 
| 25.13 (163)
| 
| 17.14 (116)
| Gabba
| 15,772
| Saturday, 27 July
|- bgcolor="#FFFFFF"
| 
| 16.12 (108)
| 
| 17.12 (114)
| MCG
| 28,776
| Sunday, 28 July
|- bgcolor="#FFFFFF"
| 
| 15.14 (104)
| 
| 12.6 (78)
| Subiaco Oval
| 17,513
| Sunday, 28 July
|- bgcolor="#FFFFFF"
| 
| 26.10 (166)
| 
| 9.13 (67)
| Football Park
| 31,880
| Sunday, 28 July

Round 18

|- bgcolor="#CCCCFF"
| Home team
| Score
| Away team
| Score
| Venue
| Attendance
| Date
|- bgcolor="#FFFFFF"
| 
| 19.16 (130)
| 
| 15.9 (99)
| MCG
| 28,555
| Friday, 2 August
|- bgcolor="#FFFFFF"
| 
| 23.7 (145)
| 
| 11.18 (84)
| Optus Oval
| 15,277
| Saturday, 3 August
|- bgcolor="#FFFFFF"
| 
| 13.10 (88)
| 
| 11.12 (78)
| Waverley Park
| 30,065
| Saturday, 3 August
|- bgcolor="#FFFFFF"
| 
| 15.14 (104)
| 
| 10.9 (69)
| Kardinia Park
| 17,818
| Saturday, 3 August
|- bgcolor="#FFFFFF"
| 
| 17.13 (115)
| 
| 6.16 (52)
| SCG
| 18,850
| Sunday, 4 August
|- bgcolor="#FFFFFF"
| 
| 14.15 (99)
| 
| 14.9 (93)
| Subiaco Oval
| 37,669
| Sunday, 4 August
|- bgcolor="#FFFFFF"
| 
| 6.9 (45)
| 
| 8.12 (60)
| Whitten Oval
| 8,757
| Sunday, 4 August
|- bgcolor="#FFFFFF"
| 
| 7.11 (53)
| 
| 9.16 (70)
| Optus Oval
| 17,157
| Sunday, 4 August

Round 19

|- bgcolor="#CCCCFF"
| Home team
| Score
| Away team
| Score
| Venue
| Attendance
| Date
|- bgcolor="#FFFFFF"
| 
| 15.16 (106)
| 
| 11.16 (82)
| WACA
| 22,874
| Friday, 9 August
|- bgcolor="#FFFFFF"
| 
| 20.9 (129)
| 
| 17.8 (110)
| MCG
| 30,166
| Saturday, 10 August
|- bgcolor="#FFFFFF"
| 
| 21.17 (143)
| 
| 16.11 (107)
| Optus Oval
| 15,794
| Saturday, 10 August
|- bgcolor="#FFFFFF"
| 
| 18.19 (127)
| 
| 12.10 (82)
| Kardinia Park
| 21,081
| Saturday, 10 August
|- bgcolor="#FFFFFF"
| 
| 5.5 (35)
| 
| 13.10 (88)
| Whitten Oval
| 7,781
| Saturday, 10 August
|- bgcolor="#FFFFFF"
| 
| 20.12 (132)
| 
| 10.5 (65)
| Waverley Park
| 14,914
| Saturday, 10 August
|- bgcolor="#FFFFFF"
| 
| 20.10 (130)
| 
| 12.10 (82)
| SCG
| 28,541
| Sunday, 11 August
|- bgcolor="#FFFFFF"
| 
| 8.11 (59)
| 
| 11.11 (77)
| Optus Oval
| 15,453
| Sunday, 11 August

Round 20

|- bgcolor="#CCCCFF"
| Home team
| Score
| Away team
| Score
| Venue
| Attendance
| Date
|- bgcolor="#FFFFFF"
| 
| 13.14 (92)
| 
| 10.11 (71)
| MCG
| 15,494
| Friday, 16 August
|- bgcolor="#FFFFFF"
| 
| 19.18 (132)
| 
| 9.13 (67)
| MCG
| 50,633
| Saturday, 17 August
|- bgcolor="#FFFFFF"
| 
| 7.7 (49)
| 
| 9.18 (72)
| Waverley Park
| 28,897
| Saturday, 17 August
|- bgcolor="#FFFFFF"
| 
| 14.16 (100)
| 
| 29.13 (187)
| Optus Oval
| 6,469
| Saturday, 17 August
|- bgcolor="#FFFFFF"
| 
| 10.10 (70)
| 
| 10.16 (76)
| Football Park
| 33,030
| Saturday, 17 August
|- bgcolor="#FFFFFF"
| 
| 14.11 (95)
| 
| 8.9 (57)
| Optus Oval
| 7,677
| Sunday, 18 August
|- bgcolor="#FFFFFF"
| 
| 9.10 (64)
| 
| 11.11 (77)
| MCG
| 51,057
| Sunday, 18 August
|- bgcolor="#FFFFFF"
| 
| 19.13 (127)
| 
| 10.8 (68)
| Subiaco Oval
| 40,085
| Sunday, 18 August

Round 21

|- bgcolor="#CCCCFF"
| Home team
| Score
| Away team
| Score
| Venue
| Attendance
| Date
|- bgcolor="#FFFFFF"
| 
| 14.12 (96)
| 
| 16.13 (109)
| MCG
| 52,426
| Friday, 23 August
|- bgcolor="#FFFFFF"
| 
| 13.18 (96)
| 
| 9.12 (66)
| Optus Oval
| 21,674
| Saturday, 24 August
|- bgcolor="#FFFFFF"
| 
| 14.16 (100)
| 
| 12.10 (82)
| MCG
| 69,237
| Saturday, 24 August
|- bgcolor="#FFFFFF"
| 
| 9.9 (63)
| 
| 12.8 (80)
| Waverley Park
| 28,118
| Saturday, 24 August
|- bgcolor="#FFFFFF"
| 
| 10.11 (71)
| 
| 10.10 (70)
| Gabba
| 19,204
| Saturday, 24 August
|- bgcolor="#FFFFFF"
| 
| 28.19 (187)
| 
| 5.6 (36)
| MCG
| 48,884
| Sunday, 25 August
|- bgcolor="#FFFFFF"
| 
| 24.7 (151)
| 
| 11.12 (78)
| Subiaco Oval
| 33,689
| Sunday, 25 August
|- bgcolor="#FFFFFF"
| 
| 14.12 (96)
| 
| 24.9 (153)
| Football Park
| 40,212
| Sunday, 25 August

Round 22

|- bgcolor="#CCCCFF"
| Home team
| Score
| Away team
| Score
| Venue
| Attendance
| Date
|- bgcolor="#FFFFFF"
| 
| 11.13 (79)
| 
| 11.10 (76)
| MCG
| 42,598
| Friday, 30 August
|- bgcolor="#FFFFFF"
| 
| 9.11 (65)
| 
| 16.11 (107)
| Kardinia Park
| 27,659
| Saturday, 31 August
|- bgcolor="#FFFFFF"
| 
| 15.10 (100)
| 
| 6.15 (51)
| Victoria Park
| 21,126
| Saturday, 31 August
|- bgcolor="#FFFFFF"
| 
| 20.24 (144)
| 
| 11.9 (75)
| Waverley Park
| 14,778
| Saturday, 31 August
|- bgcolor="#FFFFFF"
| 
| 15.11 (101)
| 
| 15.12 (102)
| MCG
| 63,196
| Saturday, 31 August
|- bgcolor="#FFFFFF"
| 
| 12.13 (85)
| 
| 6.14 (50)
| SCG
| 29,517
| Saturday, 31 August
|- bgcolor="#FFFFFF"
| 
| 16.13 (109)
| 
| 21.15 (141)
| MCG
| 61,740
| Sunday, 1 September
|- bgcolor="#FFFFFF"
| 
| 24.13 (157)
| 
| 10.11 (71)
| Subiaco Oval
| 22,574
| Sunday, 1 September

Note: Last game of Fitzroy Lions before merger with Brisbane Bears to become Brisbane Lions.

Ladder

Ladder progression

Finals

Qualifying Finals

|- bgcolor="#CCCCFF"
| Home team
| Score
| Away team
| Score
| Venue
| Attendance
| Date
|- bgcolor="#FFFFFF"
| 
| 15.11 (101)
| 
| 15.10 (100)
| Gabba
| 21,964
| Friday, 6 September
|- bgcolor="#FFFFFF"
| 
| 18.17 (125)
| 
| 10.10 (70)
| Subiaco Oval
| 41,501
| Saturday, 7 September
|- bgcolor="#FFFFFF"
| 
| 13.12 (90)
| 
| 12.12 (84)
| SCG
| 37,010
| Saturday, 7 September
|- bgcolor="#FFFFFF"
| 
| 19.17 (131)
| 
| 9.17 (71)
| MCG
| 69,323
| Sunday, 8 September

Note: The SCG match was the Swans' first finals win since the 1945 Second-Semi-final, when they were known as South Melbourne. This is the longest period for any club in VFL/AFL history without winning even one final, although St. Kilda won only one final between 1914 and 1964 inclusive.

Semi-finals

|- bgcolor="#CCCCFF"
| Home team
| Score
| Away team
| Score
| Venue
| Attendance
| Date
|- bgcolor="#FFFFFF"
| 
| 8.19 (67)
| 
| 22.12 (144)
| MCG
| 85,656
| Saturday, 14 September
|- bgcolor="#FFFFFF"
| 
| 26.14 (170)
| 
| 10.13 (73)
| Gabba
| 21,767
| Saturday, 14 September

Note: West Coast Eagles played its "home" final at the MCG despite being ranked above Essendon due to the agreement then in place with the Melbourne Cricket Club that at least one game each week of the finals be played at the MCG.

Preliminary Finals

|- bgcolor="#CCCCFF"
| Home team
| Score
| Away team
| Score
| Venue
| Attendance
| Date
|- bgcolor="#FFFFFF"
| 
| 17.12 (114)
| 
| 11.10 (76)
| MCG
| 66,719
| Saturday, 21 September
|- bgcolor="#FFFFFF"
| 
| 10.10 (70)
| 
| 10.9 (69)
| SCG
| 41,731
| Saturday, 21 September

Note: Last game of Brisbane Bears before merger with Fitzroy Lions to become Brisbane Lions.

Note: Tony Lockett kicked a behind after the siren to send the Swans to the Grand Final for the first time since South Melbourne's last appearance in 1945.

Note: Essendon became the first team in VFL/AFL history to lose two finals in the same season by one point.

Grand Final

|- bgcolor="#CCCCFF"
| Home team
| Score
| Away team
| Score
| Venue
| Attendance
| Date
|- bgcolor="#FFFFFF"
| 
| 19.17 (131)
| 
| 13.10 (88)
| MCG
| 93,102
| Saturday, 28 September

Attendance

Awards
The reserves premiership was won by 
The seniors premiership was won by

Notes
 North Melbourne's Corey McKernan received the same number of Brownlow Medal votes as the joint-winners James Hird and Michael Voss, but was ineligible to receive a medal as McKernan was suspended for one match during the season for kneeing. McKernan went on to win the AFL Players Association MVP, which is not subject to the same eligibility criteria.
The remaining 24 minutes was played three nights later on Tuesday, 11 June.
 Subsequently, the AFL introduced contingencies that a game could be abandoned, with the progress result accepted as final at any point beyond half time, at the agreement of the captains when (a) any unexpected incident delays a game by half an hour, or (b) if dangerous weather conditions, most typically lightning, prevail.
 Footscray's 1996 season became the subject of the sports film, Year of the Dogs, which was released theatrically the following year.
 After their round 17 loss to Collingwood, caretaker coach Terry Wallace infamously sprayed the players during his post-match address.
  received a special gold-coloured premiership cup, instead of the typical silver, to signify what the AFL had represented as its Centenary Season throughout 1996. (Note: 1996 was the VFL/AFL's hundredth season, which by strictest definition is not the same as the centenary year, which would have been in 1997).
 As well as breaking a 51 year grand final appearance drought, Sydney would also break a 51 year finals win drought, with the qualifying final vs Hawthorn being their first finals win since the 1945 season (as South Melbourne).
 The season is perhaps best remembered for its preliminary final between minor premiers  and sixth-placed . With scores level on 10.9 (69), Sydney's Tony Lockett scored a behind with a kick after the siren to win the game, and sent the Swans into their first Grand Final since 1945.
Lockett had been under an injury cloud with a groin problem during the preceding week, and there was some doubt whether he would play.

References

 1996 Season - AFL Tables

 
AFL season
Australian Football League seasons